The 1966 Tour de Romandie was the 20th edition of the Tour de Romandie cycle race and was held from 12 May to 15 May 1966. The race started in Geneva and finished in Lausanne. The race was won by Gianni Motta.

General classification

References

1966
Tour de Romandie
May 1966 sports events in Europe